Sucker Brook is the name of several streams in the United States:

Sucker Brook (Lawrence Brook), in central New Jersey
Sucker Brook (Canandaigua Lake), in the western Finger Lakes region of New York

See also
Little Massabesic Brook-Sucker Brook, in New Hampshire